Chanell Stone is an American photographer. She is Black and known for her "Natura Negra" series. Stone lives and works in Oakland, California.

Early life and education 
She received an associate degree in English from Los Angeles Trade-Technical College in 2017. Stone received a BFA degree in photography from California College of the Arts in 2019.

Work 
Chanell Stone's work predominantly features black and white self-portraits. She first took an analog photography class in high school and continues to use film in her practice, primarily shooting with a Pentax.

Stone was a featured photographer in W Magazine's "These Are the 8 Young Photographers to Follow in 2020". She was also a shortlisted finalist for the 2020 San Francisco Artadia Award. She attributes her interest in representation and self-portraiture to growing up with social media, namely Myspace. Portrait photography continues to be her primary focus.

Her series "Natura Negra" explores the connection of black bodies and nature, specifically the nature that can be found in dense cities or what she refers to as "urban nature". This series sets out to reclaim and reconnect black bodies to nature, even if it is in an urban setting. Stone says, "As Black people, it feels like these rural spaces aren't for us. I want to turn that idea on its head." Stone also aims to dispel the problematic idea that Black people’s only connection to nature is through slavery. "Natura Negra" won her an emerging artist award from the Museum of the African Diaspora in San Francisco.

Stone has also worked as an editorial photographer for the California Sunday Magazine, documenting a family affected by the Camp Fire in Paradise, California in 2018.

For Black History Month in February 2021, Apple, Inc. commissioned 30 photographers to contribute to the Shot on iPhone campaign, "Hometown". Stone contributed pictures of Oakland, California that were featured on Apple's Instagram account as well as billboards around the San Francisco Bay Area.

Awards and fellowships 
Among the honors which Stone has earned are:

 2020 Artist in Residence, Real Time and Space
 2019–2020 Emerging Artist Award, Museum of the African Diaspora San Francisco
 2018–2019  Purchase Prize Award, Center for Photography at Woodstock
 2018–2019  Kate V. and Harry W. Davies Memorial Scholarship, California College of the Arts
 2017–2019  Diversity Scholarship, California College of the Arts
 2017–2019  Faculty Honors Scholarship, California College of the Arts

Exhibitions 
Kala Art Institute, Berkeley, California, "Poetics of Conflict" (2018)
 Center for Photography at Woodstock, Woodstock, NY, "Photography Now" (2018)
Ortega y Gasset Projects, Brooklyn, NY, "Vice Versa" (2018)
 Aperture Foundation, New York, NY, "Aperture Summer Open: Delirious Cities” (2019)
 SF Camerawork, San Francisco, CA, "Forecast" (2019)
Hit Gallery, San Francisco, CA, "Brass Tacks" (2019)
Berkeley Art Center, Berkeley, CA "Experiments in the Field: Creative Collaboration in the Age of Ecological Concern” (2020)
Museum of the African Diaspora, San Francisco, CA, "Natura Negra" (2020)
Apple, Inc., Shot on iPhone, "Hometown" (2021)

Collections 
Stone's work is held in the following permanent collections:

 Center for Photography at Woodstock, Woodstock, New York
 Meyer Library: Artist Book Collection, Oakland, California

References

External links 
Housing Projects And Empty Lots. How Chanell Stone Is Reframing Nature Photography Photo story on NPR

American contemporary artists
1992 births
American photographers
African-American photographers
21st-century American women artists
Artists from the San Francisco Bay Area
California College of the Arts alumni
Living people
21st-century African-American women
21st-century African-American artists
Photographers from California
21st-century American women photographers
21st-century American photographers